Fairview, Indiana may refer to:

Fairview, Randolph County, Indiana, an unincorporated community in Green Township
Fairview, Rush County, Indiana, an unincorporated community in Rush and Fayette counties
Fairview, Switzerland County, Indiana, an unincorporated community in Cotton Township
Fairview, Washington County, Indiana, an unincorporated community in Brown Township